The Santos de San Luis (English: San Luis Saints), is the professional basketball team of the city of San Luis Potosí, that participates in the most important mexican basketball league Liga Nacional de Baloncesto Profesional (LNBP).

History 

They started in 1969, when entrepreneurs from San Luis Potosí decided to create a professional basketball team, not just to participate in the Circuito Mexicano de Básquetbol (CIMEBA), to become one of the best teams in the country.

Their beginning was rather shaky, but shortly thereafter they found a winning strategy and gameplay, which was then seen in their results. At CIMEBA, Santos were always among the best teams, and in the 1971-1972 season they achieved their first national championship.

The second national championship came in 1980 and, after the season finished, three players were selected to be part of the national team. The third championship was obtained in the 1997-1998 season.

The team's most important achievement was in the 2004 season, now playing in the Liga Nacional de Baloncesto Profesional (LNBP), when they were crowned after winning against the Halcones UV Xalapa and took the trophy back to San Luis Potosí.

Another memorable match was away from home court in 2004, between Los Santos Reales and Fuerza Regia from Monterrey, the latter having Dennis Rodman in their team. The Santos Reales won the match with a score [95-84].

At 2009, due to economic issues, the team was forced to leave every professional sport competition.

At 2015, with a new administration and more financial support, the team returned to the LNBP to play the 2015-2016 season, but under the new name of C.B. Santos San Luis.

At 2020, due to the absence of people at the stadium, consequence of the SARS-CoV-2 pandemic, the team decided not to participate in the 2020 LNBP season, hopping to return for the next one.

Stadium 
C.B. Santos San Luis team plays its local game at the Auditorio Miguel Barragán, located in the city of San Luis Potosí. This indoor court is available to admit 3,400 spectators.

Players

Current roster

Outstanding players 

  Arim Abdul Solares Astorga.
  Armando Mariscal Mata.
  Joe Small.
  Mark Borders.
  Omar Quintero Pereda.
  Víctor Mariscal Mata.

See also 

 Auditorio Miguel Barragán.
 Liga Nacional de Baloncesto Profesional(LNBP).
 Independence Cup.
 Mexican Basketball Federation.
 Mexican Basketball Sport Association.
 San Luis Potosí City.
 State de San Luis Potosí.

References

External links 
 Sitio Oficial de la Liga Nacional de Baloncesto Profesional
 Sitio Oficial de la Federación Mexicana de Baloncesto

Basketball teams in Mexico
Sports teams in San Luis Potosí
Sport in San Luis Potosí City
1969 establishments in Mexico
Basketball teams established in 1969